Mores Island Airport  is a public use airport located near Moore's Island, the Bahamas.

Airlines and destinations

See also
List of airports in the Bahamas

References

External links 
 Airport record for Mores Island Airport at Landings.com

Airports in the Bahamas